Palladium Times Square (formerly PlayStation Theater, Best Buy Theater and Nokia Theatre Times Square) is an indoor live events venue in New York City, located in One Astor Plaza, at the corner of Broadway and 44th Street. It was designed by architect David Rockwell and opened in September 2005. The venue has a large standing room orchestra section, combined with a large area of seating towards the rear of the auditorium.

The venue was originally built as the Loews Astor Plaza Theatre, a movie theater operated by Loews Theatres, which opened in 1974 and closed in August 2004. The space was leased by the Anschutz Entertainment Group (AEG), who converted it to a live-event venue at an estimated total cost of $21 million.

Due to the expiration of its lease, the PlayStation Theater closed on December 31, 2019, after a set of shows by Philadelphia trance fusion band Disco Biscuits. The Theater reopened in 2020 as Palladium Times Square.

Features
The venue seats 2,100 and features an  LED high-definition screen that is one of the largest marquees on Broadway. The venue is also capable of presenting live footage from the stage or anywhere else in the theater. The theater's marquee sign was directly connected to MTV Studios and allowed for live footage from there to be displayed as well.

The building also includes two private mezzanines, several dressing rooms, and a green room for up to 30 people. The theater hosts concerts, event parties, live television, web broadcasts, and award shows, including the Heisman Trophy ceremony, which took place at the theater from 2005 to 2019.

Gallery

References

External links
Palladium Times Square's Official Website

1974 establishments in New York City
2019 disestablishments in New York (state)
Music venues in Manhattan
Times Square buildings
Theater District, Manhattan
Best Buy
PlayStation (brand)
2004 disestablishments in New York (state)
2005 establishments in New York City